Yewande Lawal Simpson is a Nigerian actress and model. She was formerly known as Yewande Lawal Adebisi. She won Miss Lagos Carnival Pageant in 2012.

Biography 
She is the fifth of six children. Lawal married Wanri Simpson in 2018. She lost her mother in 2020.

Education 
Lawal's primary and secondary education was in Nigeria, she also has a bachelor's degree in Creative Arts from the University of Lagos.

Career 
Lawal's acting career started professionally in 2009 after featuring in the Nigerian TV series Living in Lagos. She won the Miss Lagos Carnival Pageant and in the same year, she got a role to feature as Shoshanna in the Nigerian television soap opera Tinsel in 2012. She has also starred in short films, TV and web series such as: The men's club, Jemeji, Journey to self, The room, Out of sight, Foreign Love, amongst others.

Selected filmography 
 Tinsel (2008)
 Journey to Self (2012)
 The Men's Club (2018)
The Auction (2018)
Jimeji (20)
The Room (20)
Unbreakable (2019)
The Set up (2019)

References

External links 
 https://www.imdb.com/name/nm10295078/

Nigerian film actresses
Living people
1991 births
University of Lagos alumni
Nigerian beauty pageant contestants
Nigerian female models
Nigerian television actresses
21st-century Nigerian actresses
Yoruba actresses
Nigerian media personalities